The Wheel is a 1925 American silent drama film directed by Victor Schertzinger and starring Margaret Livingston, Harrison Ford, and Claire Adams.

Plot
As described in a film magazine reviews, Ted Morton’s habit of gambling worries his parents, who make him promise to quit. When he announces that he is going to marry a milliner, his father objects to this also, and Ted leaves home. He and Kate are married. Edward Baker, a gambling house owner, had also wanted Kate, so decides to break Ted to revenge himself. He buys a costly car from Ted, who is now a salesman. When Ted appears to collect the money owned on the car for his company, Baker induces him to gamble with it. Ted loses, and confesses the loss to Kate, who in her turn confesses to losing money on a horse race. Baker, remorseful, gives Ted a check for the amount he had lost. Kate and Ted swear off gambling.

Cast

Preservation
With no prints of The Wheel located in any film archives, it is a lost film.

References

Bibliography
Solomon, Aubrey. The Fox Film Corporation, 1915-1935: A History and Filmography. McFarland, 2011.

External links

Lobby card at Getty Images

1925 films
1925 drama films
1920s English-language films
American silent feature films
Silent American drama films
Films directed by Victor Schertzinger
American black-and-white films
Fox Film films
1920s American films